Myelin transcription factor 1 like is a protein that in humans is encoded by the MYT1L gene.

Function

This gene encodes a member of the zinc finger superfamily of transcription factors whose expression, thus far, has been found only in neuronal tissues. The encoded protein belongs to a novel class of cystein-cystein-histidine-cystein zinc finger proteins that function in the developing mammalian central nervous system. Forced expression of this gene in combination with the basic helix-loop-helix transcription factor NeuroD1 and the transcription factors POU class 3 homeobox 2 and achaete-scute family basic helix-loop-helix transcription factor 1 can convert fetal and postnatal human fibroblasts into induced neuronal cells, which are able to generate action potentials. Mutations in this gene have been associated with an autosomal dominant form of cognitive disability and with autism spectrum disorder. Alternative splicing results in multiple variants. [provided by RefSeq, Jul 2017].

References

Further reading